Goran Stevanović (born 27 November 1966) is a Serbian football manager and former player.

Playing career
He started his career in Partizan, a club where he passed all categories, from pioneers to seniors. He played a total of 328 games and scored 79 goals. He won the league title with Partizan twice: in 1985–86 and 1986–87.

He played abroad in Spain in Portugal, playing for Osasuna (1991–1993), Farense (1993–1994), Vitória Setúbal (1994–1996), Campomaiorense (1996) and União da Madeira (1996–1997). For the last two seasons of his career (1997–1999), he played for Greek clubs Veria and Panelefsiniakos.

He played for the pioneer, U20, U21, Olympic and A national teams. The only match for the senior side of Yugoslavia was in October 1985 against Austria in Linz.

Coaching career
In January 2011, Stevanović was appointed as the new Ghana coach. On 19 March 2012, Stevanović was sacked as the Ghana coach.

On 6 June 2013, Stevanovic was hired by the Greek Super League side Veria F.C. On 27 August 2013, Stevanovic left his Veria F.C. position.

On 5 September 2013, Stevanovic has signed a one-year deal with Chinese side Qingdao Jonoon. He was sacked at the end of 2013 season after Qingdao Jonoon relegation to China League One.

On 25 November 2015, Stevanovic has signed a 1,5 years deal with Greek Football League club Agrotikos Asteras F.C.
 
On 25 December 2017, Stevanovic signed with Chinese side Qingdao Jonoon.

Personal life
His daughter is volleyball player Jovana Stevanović.

References

External links
 Goran Stevanović at reprezentacija.rs

1966 births
Living people
Sportspeople from Sremska Mitrovica
Yugoslav footballers
Serbian footballers
Association football midfielders
Yugoslavia international footballers
Serbian football managers
FK Partizan players
CA Osasuna players
S.C. Farense players
Vitória F.C. players
C.F. União players
S.C. Campomaiorense players
Veria F.C. players
Yugoslav First League players
La Liga players
Primeira Liga players
Super League Greece players
FK Partizan managers
Serbian expatriate footballers
Expatriate footballers in Spain
Expatriate footballers in Portugal
Expatriate footballers in Greece
Serbian expatriate sportspeople in Spain
Serbian expatriate sportspeople in Portugal
Serbian expatriate sportspeople in Greece
Serbian expatriate football managers
Expatriate football managers in Ghana
Expatriate football managers in China
Expatriate football managers in Greece
Serbian expatriate sportspeople in China
2012 Africa Cup of Nations managers
Veria F.C. managers
Ghana national football team managers
FK Čukarički managers
Panelefsiniakos F.C. players
Serbian expatriate sportspeople in Ghana